Erhard Weigel (16 December 1625 – 20 March 1699) was a German mathematician, astronomer and philosopher.

Biography
Weigel earned his M.A. (1650) and his habilitation (1652) from the University of Leipzig. From 1653 until his death he was professor of mathematics at Jena University. He was the teacher of Leibniz in summer 1663, and other notable students. He also worked to make science more widely accessible to the public, and what would today be considered a populariser of science.

He concurred with Jakob Ellrod's "Mittel-Calendar", and with the advocacy of Leibniz and others, that the date of Easter should be based on the astronomical measurement of the spring equinox and the next full moon. He followed Jakob Ellrod to the Imperial Diet in Regensburg to advocate the use of the Mittel-Calendar or New Gregorian calendar.

Timeline
 1625 born in Weiden in der Oberpfalz, son of clothier Michael Weigel and Anna Weigel
 1627–28 seizures of the Upper Palatinate through imperial troops starting with recatholicization; escape of the Weigel family from Wunsiedel to Ansbach-Bayreuth
 1638–44 teen years at grammar school in Wunsiedel
 1644–46 Lutheran high school in Halle (Saale) and simultaneous activity with the astronomer Bartholomäus Schimpfer, who teaches him mathematics
 1646 temporary return to Wunsiedel; mathematics and astronomy instruction with archdeacon Jakob Ellrod
 1647–50 studies at the University of Leipzig
 1650 MA in philosophy: De ascensionibus et descensionibus astronomicis dissertatio (Astronomical dissertation on risings and settings)
 1652 habilitation in Leipzig with Dissertatio Metaphysica Prior (De Existentia); Dissertatio Metaphysica Posterior (De Modo Existentiae, qui dicitur Duratio)
 1653 post as mathematics professor in Jena
 1653 (16 July) begins lectures De Cometa Novo (regarding the comet of December 1652)
 1653 (12 September) marries Elisabeth Hartmann (a widow)
 1654 appointment as Stipendiarorum et Alumnorum Inspector (supervision over the Collegium Jenense)
 1658 publishes the analysis Aristotelica ex Euclide restituta, genuinum sciendi modum, & nativam restauratae Philosophiae faciem per omnes disciplinas & facultates ichnographicè depingens; the work brings him into conflict with the philosophical faculty
 1660 publishes Theodixis Pythagorica (revised edition 1675)
 1661 publishes Himmelsspiegels (Speculum Uranicum / Aquilae Romanae Sacrum...)
 1663 Gottfried Wilhelm Leibniz, studies one semester in Jena, among others under Erhard Weigel
 1664 publishes of the Speculum Temporis Civilis, containing explanation of the calendar
 1665 publishes Speculum Terrae
 1667–70 Weigel's house, in Jena, for its time has remarkable technical interior facilities—among others an elevator and a water pipe
 1669 publishes Idea Matheseos Universae cum Speciminibus Inventionum Mathematicarum
 1673 publishes Universi Corporis Pansophici Caput Summum
 1673 publishes Tetractys, Sumum eum Arithmeticae eum Philosophiae discursivae Compendium
 1674 publishes an arithmetic description of morals Arithmetische Beschreibung der Moral-Weissheit von Personen und Sachen worauf das gemeine Wesen bestehet
 1679 Weigel's work on "the mystery of Holy Trinity demonstrated from the principle of geometry", brings him in conflict with the theological faculty and he is forced to retract his work
 1683 wife Elisabeth dies
 1688 appointed imperial advisor
 1691 goes to England to describe research results to the Royal Society, but only reaches the coast where the weather prevents crossing the British Channel
 1691 calls on the Dutch naturalist Christiaan Huygens at his estate
 1693 publishes Philosophia Mathematica, Theologia Naturalis Solida
 1695 becomes chancellor of the University of Jena
 1699 dies in Jena

(Source:)

Legacy
Weigel was arguably one of the earliest German PhD holders.

Through Leibniz, Weigel is the intellectual forefather of a long tradition of mathematicians and mathematical physicists that connects a great number of professionals to this day (see Academic genealogy of theoretical physicists: Erhard Weigel). The Mathematics Genealogy Project lists more than 50,000 "descendants" of Weigel's, including Lagrange, Euler, Poisson and several Fields Medalists.

The crater Weigel on the Moon is named after him. In 1999 a colloquium was held in Jena on the 300th anniversary of his death.

See also
 Doctor of Philosophy: History

Notes

References
 Katharina Habermann, Klaus-Dieter Herbst (Hrsg.): Erhard Weigel (1625–1699) und seine Schüler. Beiträge des 7. Erhard-Weigel-Kolloquiums 2014. (Göttingen [Niedersachsen]) : Universitätsverlag Göttingen, 2016. – 376 pp. .
 Stefan Kratochwil, Volker Leppin (Hrsg.): Erhard Weigel und die Theologie. [Vorträge des 3. Erhard-Weigel-Kolloquiums, Jena, 11. & 12. Dezember 2003], Berlin: LIT-Verlag, 2015 (Arbeiten zur Historischen und Systematischen Theologie, Band 12), .
 Schielicke, Reinhard E. et al., 1999, Erhard Weigel - 1625 to 1699. Baroque patriarch of the early German Enlightenment. Proceedings of the colloquium held in Jena on March 20, 1999, on the occasion of the 300th anniversary of his death (= Acta Historica Astronomiae, vol. 7).
 Reinhard Breymayer: Astronomie, Kalenderstreit und Liebestheologie. Von Erhard Weigel und seinem Schüler Detlev Clüver über Friedrich Christoph Oetinger und Philipp Matthäus Hahn zu Friedrich Schiller, Johann Andreas Streicher, Franz Joseph Graf von Thun und Hohenstein, Mozart und Beethoven. Dußlingen : Noûs-Verlag Thomas Leon Heck 2016. - 227 pp. - .

Further reading
 Behme, T. (2019). "Erhard Weigel's Proof of the Existence of God and its Critique by Leibniz". Studia Leibnitiana 51(2), pp. 247–264.

External links
 

1625 births
1699 deaths
People from Weiden in der Oberpfalz
17th-century German mathematicians
17th-century German astronomers
Leipzig University alumni
Academic staff of the University of Jena